Fitzroy Heslop, better known as Fabio, is a British drum and bass DJ and producer. Fabio has been described as one of the best DJs of all time, and together with DJ partner Grooverider are regarded as the "originators" of the scene.

Biography
Fabio has been at the forefront of the dance/rave scene for over two decades. He started his career on the pirate radio station Faze 1 in the mid-1980s, and DJing at Brixton club Mendozas, where he would first meet his longtime DJ partner Grooverider, the pair were at the forefront as the acid house scene exploded. Fabio and Grooverider developed their sound and partnership at raves up and down the country but particularly at the groundbreaking Rage at Heaven.

Taking the music from the raves to the radio with Grooverider on Kiss 100 between 1994 and 1997, then on to BBC Radio 1 initially hosting the One in the Jungle show, and then with their own immensely popular show from 1998. The Radio 1 show is credited with helping bring drum and bass to mainstream audiences. Fabio left the show and the station (along with Grooverider) when the new BBC Radio 1 lineup commenced in April 2012.

In September 2016, they brought their long-running radio show to London's Rinse FM.

Fabio is in a relationship with DJ Charlotte Devaney.

Selected discography

Mixes/compilations
Promised Land Vol 2 (Higher Limits, 1996)
Liquid Funk (Creative Source, 2000)
FabricLive.10 (Fabric, 2003)
Fabio & Grooverider - Drum & Bass Arena (Resist, 2004)
Drum and Bass Arena Presents Friction and Fabio (New State Recordings, 2008)

References

External links

1965 births
BBC Radio 1 presenters
DJs from London
Black British DJs
British radio DJs
Club DJs
English drum and bass musicians
English record producers
Living people
Ministry of Sound
People from Brixton
Electronic dance music DJs